Voglarji is a dispersed settlement in the Municipality of Nova Gorica in western Slovenia. Voglarji includes the hamlets of Zavrh and Cvetrež.

Geography
Voglarji is located on the high Trnovo Forest Plateau, overlooking the Vipava Valley. The part of the larger plateau known as the Voglarji Plateau is named after Voglarji.

Mass grave
Voglarji is the site of a mass grave from the period immediately after the Second World War. The Cvetrež Shaft Mass Grave, also known as the Cvetrež 3 Shaft Mass Grave is located south of the settlement on the east side of the road to the hamlet of Cvetrež. It contains the remains of Home Guard and Italian prisoners of war, and Slovene and Italian civilians murdered in May 1945.

References

External links
Voglarji on Geopedia

Populated places in the City Municipality of Nova Gorica